Ryan Shaun Higgins (born 24 March 1988) is a former Zimbabwean cricketer. He played 11 One Day Internationals for Zimbabwe in 2006, highlights include the wicket of Brian Lara and best bowling figures of 4/21 from 10 overs. Ryan Higgins retired from international cricket in 2007 at the age of 18. Higgins is now based in the Cotswolds and is now managing director of Gecko Cricket, the company he founded in 2012.

References

1988 births
Living people
Cricketers from Harare
White Zimbabwean sportspeople
Manicaland cricketers
Zimbabwe One Day International cricketers
Zimbabwean cricketers